Cēsis, is a town in Latvia located in the northern part of the Central Vidzeme Upland. Cēsis is on the Gauja River valley, and is built on a series of ridges above the river overlooking the woods below. Cēsis was one of the candidate cities for the title of European Capital of Culture 2014 (Riga was the Latvian city that won the title).

Castle

The oldest settlement in Cēsis is the hillfort on Riekstu hill, a fortified wooden castle built by a tribe known as the Vends. The  mound with its partly preserved fortification system can still be seen in the Castle Park. This settlement was located near major trade routes from west to east and dominated the regional countryside.

German crusaders known as the Livonian Brothers of the Sword began construction of a castle Wenden near the hill fort in 1209. When the castle was enlarged and fortified, it served as the residence for the Order's Master. In 1577, during the Livonian War, the garrison destroyed the castle to prevent it from falling into the control of Ivan the Terrible, who was decisively defeated in the Battle of Wenden (1578). In 1598 it was incorporated into the Polish–Lithuanian Commonwealth and the Wenden Voivodeship was created. In 1620 Wenden was conquered by Sweden. It was rebuilt afterwards, but destroyed again in 1703 during the Great Northern War by the Russian army and left in a ruined state. From the end of the 16th century, the premises of the Order's castle were adapted to the requirements of the Cēsis castle estate. When in 1777 the Cēsis castle estate was obtained by Count Sievers, he had his new residence house built on the site of the Eastern Block of the castle, joining its end wall with the fortification tower. Since 1949, the Cēsis History Museum has been located in the New Castle on the Cēsis Castle estate. The front yard of the New Castle is enclosed by a granary and a stable-coach house, which now houses the Exhibition Hall of the Museum. Beside the granary there is the oldest brewery in Latvia—Cēsu Alus, which was built in 1878 during the latter years of Count Sievers' residency, but its origins date back to the period of the Livonian Order.

Further on is the Cēsis castle park, which was laid out in 1812. The park has the romantic characteristic of that time, with its foot-paths, exotic plants, and the waters of the pond reflecting the castle's ruins.

The town

The planning of the town of Cēsis was done in the second half of the 13th century. The market place with a church was in the centre of the town. The centre of housing was the stone castle of the Livonian Order with its three fortified towers. The town was also encircled by a dolomite stone wall with eight towers and five gates. Buildings from the Middle Ages include St. John's Church (built 1281–1284), the ruins of the Order's castle, Cēsis Castle and fortification walls, fragments of which can still be seen at Vaļņu iela and Palasta iela. In addition, ancient road networks and building plots have survived from medieval times, although many of the buildings themselves have been ruined (the last destroyed in 1748). 18th century buildings can be seen at 16 and 25 Rīgas iela, while houses built in the first part of the 19th century are at 15 and 47 Rīgas iela, 6 Gaujas iela, and other streets.

Cēsis was occupied by the Swedish king Gustavus Adolphus in 1621 during the Polish–Swedish War.

In the second half of the 19th century, the construction of the Rīga-Pskov highway (1868) and the Rīga-Valka railway line (1889) accelerated the development of the town. Raunas iela, leading from the railway station to the Old Town, was developed as a wide, presentable street with the Latvian Society House at 10 Raunas iela (architect Augusts Malvess), the Building of the Regional Court at 14 Raunas iela (architect P. Mengelis), and other important buildings.

The Battle of Cēsis in June 1919, when Estonian and Latvian forces defeated the Germans, was one of the decisive battles in the Latvian War of Independence.

Cēsis was also developed as a health resort. Upmarket summer houses and health centres were built in the vicinity of the Gauja. 'Cīrulīši' near the Svētavots (Holy Spring) Cave is the most remarkable of them, with a spring believed to possess healing powers.

Climate

Notable people 

 Johann Graf von Sievers (1778–1827), Russian general
 Emanuel Count von Sievers (1817–1909), Russian Senator
 Heinrich Leonhard Adolphi (1852–1918), German-Baltic pastor and chess composer, Evangelical Lutheran martyr
 Alfrēds Kalniņš (1879–1951), composer
 Eduard Erdmann (1896–1958), German pianist and composer
 Max Hildebert Boehm (1891–1968), sociologist
 Adolf Rüütel (1906–1981), Estonian national football player
 Wilhelm Theodor Georg Lenz (1906–1976), historian
 Nina Vatatsy (1908–1997), bibliographer
 Anita Stukāne (born 1954), long-jumper
 Laima Vaikule (born 1954), singer
 Edvīns Ķeņģis (born 1959), chess player
 Ingrīda Amantova (born 1960), luger
 Gerda Krūmiņa (born 1984), biathlete
 Baiba Bendika (born 1991), biathlete
 Rodions Kurucs (born 1998), basketball player

Twin towns—sister cities

Cēsis is twinned with:

  Achim, Germany
  Baku, Azerbaijan
  Gatchinsky District, Russia
  Konstancin-Jeziorna, Poland
  Rakvere, Estonia
  Rokiškis, Lithuania
  Tyresö, Sweden
  Venafro, Italy
  Zhovkva, Ukraine

Gallery

References

External links

 
Populated places established in the 13th century
Towns in Latvia
1206 establishments in Europe
Kreis Wenden
Cēsis Municipality
Vidzeme